Grauer's warbler (Graueria vittata) is a species of Old World warbler in the family Acrocephalidae.

It is native to the Albertine Rift montane forests.

Its name commemorates German zoologist Rudolf Grauer, who collected natural history specimens in the Belgian Congo.

References

Grauer's warbler
Birds of Central Africa
Grauer's warbler
Taxonomy articles created by Polbot